Michael Crow is a former Scottish political journalist who worked as Director of Strategy and Communications at the Scottish Conservative Party from 2009 until 2010. Following the 2010 UK General Election in which the Scottish Conservatives won only one seat, Crow's post was terminated due to 'financial constraints'.

Prior to his appointment on 4 January 2009, he was a political correspondent for Scottish television channel STV, working on regional news programmes Scotland Today and North Tonight and presenting the weekly political programme, Politics Now.

After studying journalism at Leeds University, Crow began his journalism career at BBC Radio Five Live. He then moved onto Border Television and in 1997, moved to STV to become a general reporter and then, Westminster Correspondent.

By 1999, Crow was made a Holyrood-based correspondent and covered the Scottish Parliament for STV from its official opening on 1 July 1999 until December 2008. He also presented Grampian Television's political programme Crossfire from 1999 until its axing in 2004.

References

External links
Michael Crow at stv.tv

Living people
Scottish political journalists
Scottish radio presenters
Scottish television presenters
STV News newsreaders and journalists
Year of birth missing (living people)
Place of birth missing (living people)
Scottish Conservative Party
Conservative Party (UK) officials
BBC radio presenters
Alumni of the University of Leeds